Ruby is a ghost town in Santa Cruz County, Arizona, United States.  It was founded as a mining town in Bear Valley, originally named Montana Camp, so named because the miners were mining at the foot of Montana Peak.

History

Mining started circa 1877. The Montana Mine produced gold, silver, lead, zinc and copper. At its peak in the mid-1930s, Ruby had a population of about 1,200.

On April 11, 1912 the mining camp's general store owner Julius Andrews established the post office. Andrews named the post office "Ruby", after his wife, Lille B. Ruby Andrews, and the mining camp soon became known as Ruby. The post office was discontinued on May 31, 1941.

Between 1920 and 1922, the town of Ruby and the surroundings were the scene of three double homicides known as the Ruby Murders, which led to the largest manhunt in the history of the Southwest, which included the first airplane ever used in an Arizona manhunt.

The most prosperous period for Ruby was in the late 1920s and 1930s, when the Eagle-Picher Mining Company operated the mine and upgraded the camp. From 1934 to 1937, the Montana mine was the leading lead and zinc producer in Arizona. In 1936, it was third in silver production. The mine closed in 1940, and by the end of 1941 Ruby was abandoned.

Ruby is one of the two best-preserved mining ghost towns in Arizona, along with the Vulture Mine near Wickenburg. Ruby's attractions today include approximately 25 buildings under roof, including the jail and houses, the school, the playground, mine machinery, buildings and mine workings. Ruby is entirely on private property and there is a charge for admission to the site.

Public tours are occasionally offered through Pima Community College.

See also
Bear Valley Raid
Battle of Bear Valley
List of ghost towns in Arizona

References

Further reading
 Ring, Al, et al.(2005) Ruby, Arizona: Mining, Mayhem, and Murder.  Tucson: U.S. Press and Graphics, 2005.
 Dolan, Samuel K. Cowboys and Gangsters: Stories of an Untamed Southwest (TwoDot Books, 2016)

External links

 Historic Ghost Town of Ruby, AZ
 Mining and Murder in Ruby, Arizona
 Ruby at GhostTowns.com
 Ruby – Ghost Town of the Month at azghosttowns.com

Ghost towns in Arizona
Mining communities in Arizona
Populated places in Santa Cruz County, Arizona
Historic districts on the National Register of Historic Places in Arizona
National Register of Historic Places in Santa Cruz County, Arizona
Tourist attractions in Santa Cruz County, Arizona
Populated places on the National Register of Historic Places in Arizona